The Journal of Musculoskeletal Research is a quarterly peer-reviewed medical journal covering clinical and basic research in the human musculoskeletal system. It was established in 1997 and is published by World Scientific. The journal covers musculoskeletal disorders, orthopedics, neurology, rheumatology, and rehabilitation. The editors-in-chief are  Po-Quang Chen (National Taiwan University Hospital ) and Li-Shan Chou (University of Oregon).

Abstracting and indexing 
The journal is abstracted and indexed in:

References

External links 
 

English-language journals
Publications established in 1997
World Scientific academic journals
Orthopedics journals
Quarterly journals